Qumqoʻrgʻon is a city in Surxondaryo Region, Uzbekistan. It is the administrative center of Qumqoʻrgʻon District. The town population was 12,173 people in 1989, and 14,900 in 2016.

References

Populated places in Surxondaryo Region
Cities in Uzbekistan